Rain Without End is the first album by death/doom metal band October Tide. This is the only October Tide release with Jonas Renkse on vocals. The album was reissued on 10 November 2008.

Track listing

Personnel

October Tide

Jonas Renkse – vocals, drums, guitar
Fred Norrman – guitar, bass

Additional personnel
Morion – keyboards, various effects
Christer Åberg – violin

References

1997 albums
October Tide albums
Albums produced by Dan Swanö